Sciomyzini is a tribe of flies in the family Sciomyzidae.

Genera
Apteromicra Papp, 2004
Atrichomelina Cresson, 1920
Calliscia Steyskal, 1975
Colobaea Zetterstedt, 1837
Ditaeniella Sack, 1939
Neuzina Marinoni & Knutson, 2004
Oidematops Cresson, 1920
Parectinocera Becker, 1919
Pherbellia Robineau-Desvoidy, 1830
Pseudomelina Malloch, 1933
Psacadina Enderlein, 1939
Pteromicra Lioy, 1864
Sciomyza Fallén, 1820
Tetanura Fallén, 1820

References

Sciomyzidae
Brachycera tribes